Spike is a studio album by Puffy released in 2001, and is their first North American album.

Track listing

References

Puffy AmiYumi albums
2001 albums